This is a list of tennis players who have represented the Netherlands Davis Cup team in an official Davis Cup match. The Netherlands have taken part in the competition since 1920.

Players

References

Lists of Davis Cup tennis players
Davis Cup